Hezb-e-Islami Khalid Farooqi is a faction of Hezb-e-Islami Afghanistan (at times claiming the main HiA title),

References

Islamic political parties in Afghanistan
Political parties in Afghanistan